Transnet Engineering is a rolling stock manufacturer and maintenance company. It was established when the engineering workshops of Transnet were transferred to a separate division as Transwerk. It was rebranded Transnet Rail Engineering, and then again to Transnet Engineering after it began assembling port equipment such as straddle carriers. It operates seven workshops.

See also
 2021 Transnet Cyberattack

References

External links
Transwerk's Operational Report at Transnet

Railway companies of South Africa
Rolling stock manufacturers of South Africa
Organisations based in Pretoria
Transnet